The Alstom Citadis is a family of low-floor trams and light rail vehicles built by Alstom. , over 2,300 Citadis trams have been sold and 1,800 tramways are in revenue service throughout the world, with operations in all six inhabited continents. An evolution of Alstom's earlier TFS vehicle, most Citadis vehicles are made in Alstom's factories in La Rochelle, Reichshoffen and Valenciennes, France, and in Barcelona, Spain, and Annaba, Algeria.

Citadis types
The Citadis family includes both partial and fully low-floor trams and LRVs, in versions with three (20x), five (30x), seven (40x), and nine (50x) sections. It comprises the following standard variants:

Urban tramway vehicles

Citadis X00:
Citadis 100 – three section, 70% low floor, originally designed and manufactured by Konstal in Chorzów for the Polish market (Katowice, Gdańsk)
Citadis X01 (First generation):
Citadis 301 – three section, 70% low floor (Orléans)
Citadis 301 CIS – 100% low floor version with IPOMOS bogies on  gauge (Moscow, Saint-Petersburg). Also designated 71-801 according to the Russian unified system of rolling stock classification (71=trams, 8=manufacturer code (Alstom), 01=model code).
Citadis 401 – five sections, 70% low floor (Montpellier and Dublin, some converted from 301s)
Citadis X02 (Second generation):
Citadis 202 – three section, 100% low floor (Melbourne)
Citadis 302 – five sections, 100% low floor (Algiers, Adelaide, Angers, Lyon, Bordeaux, Paris T2, T7 and T8, Valenciennes, Rotterdam, Buenos Aires, Madrid, Melbourne, Nice, Murcia, Barcelona, Jerusalem, Le Havre and Nottingham)
Citadis 402 – seven sections, 100% low floor (Bordeaux, Grenoble, Lyon, Paris T3, Dubai, Rio de Janeiro, Oran, Constantine)
Citadis 502 – nine sections, 100% low floor (Dublin, some converted from 402s)
Citadis X03 (Third generation):
Citadis 403 – seven sections, 100% low floor (Strasbourg)
Citadis X04 (Fourth generation):
Citadis 304 – 100% low floor, next generation design for Central and Eastern Europe (Istanbul)
Citadis X05 (Fifth generation):
Citadis 205 or Compact – three sections, 100% low floor (Aubagne, Avignon)
Citadis 305 – five sections, 100% low floor (Sydney, Caen, Kaohsiung, Athens)
Citadis 405 – seven sections, 100% low floor (Nice, Paris line T9, T10)

Light-rail transit vehicles
Regio-Citadis – three sections, 70% low floor LRV (Kassel, The Hague)
Citadis Dualis – four or five sections, 100% low-floor LRV (operated by the SNCF, see below)
 Citadis Spirit – three or four sections, 100% low floor LRV designed for the North American market (Ottawa, Toronto)

Power supply
Like most trams, Citadis vehicles are usually powered by overhead electric wires collected by a pantograph, but the trams in several places do not use pantograph current collection entirely. Other places, such as Toronto, use a trolley pole.

The most popular solution is Alstom's proprietary ground-level power supply (APS, first used in Bordeaux and subsequently in Angers, Reims, Orleans, Tours, Dubai, Rio, and Sydney), consisting of a type of third rail which is only powered while it is completely covered by a tram so that there is no risk of a person or animal coming into contact with a live rail. On the networks in France and in Sydney, the trams switch to conventional overhead wires in outer areas, but the Dubai vehicles are the first to employ APS for its entire passenger length (although they are still equipped with pantographs for use in the maintenance depot).

Another option is to use on-board batteries to store electrical power, allowing brief periods of catenary-free operation without the need to install special infrastructure. The Citadis trams in Nice operate off a set of nickel metallic hydride batteries in two large open spaces where overhead wires would be an eyesore. This has since been superseded by a supercapacitor-based energy storage system (SRS) which is in use in Rio de Janeiro (alongside APS), Kaohsiung, and along a new line in Nice. The Regio-Citadis can also be built as a dual-voltage or electro-diesel vehicle with various configurations.

Ordered Citadis trams

Africa

Asia

North America

The main article provides vehicle and order descriptions.

South America

Middle East

Europe

Oceania

See also
 15 kV AC railway electrification
 Ground-level power supply used in Bordeaux
 Railway electrification system

References

External links

Alstom Transport
Alstom Citadis Trams
List of all ordered Citadis (en Français/in French) (read the notes written by visitors at the end of the page, because there are some errors in the table)
Sensolab drives interior experimentation – design of Citadis tram interiors for Paris, Le Mans, Angers, Railway Gazette International

Alstom trams
Tram vehicles of Algeria
Tram vehicles of Argentina
Tram vehicles of France
Melbourne tram vehicles
Tram vehicles in Morocco
Tram vehicles of the Netherlands
Tram vehicles of Poland
Tram vehicles of the Republic of Ireland
Tram vehicles of Spain
Tram vehicles of Tunisia
Tram vehicles of Turkey
Articulated passenger trains
Articles containing video clips
Train-related introductions in 1999